Pizzo Rotondo is a mountain in the Lepontine Alps. At 3,190 metres above sea level, it is the highest mountain lying on the border between the cantons of Ticino and Valais, as well as the highest summit of the Lepontine Alps lying between Nufenen Pass and Lukmanier Pass.

The massif of Piz Rotondo separates the valleys of the upper Rhone (Valais) and upper Ticino. About two kilometres north-east lies the Witenwasserenstock, which is the watershed between the basins of the Rhone, Po and Rhine.

On the north side lies a relatively large glacier named Gerengletscher, which extends to the ridge of the Witenwasserenstock. On the south side, at Passo di Rotondo, lies a smaller glacier named Ghiacciaio del Pizzo Rotondo.

The first ascent by Viktor Haller and his guides on August 5, 1869, started from Bedretto in Ticino over the east face and the (by now nearly gone) Pesciora glacier. Only four days later, the second ascent took place, this time from the other site. F. Schläpfer and his guides  Rudolf Elmer and Johann Kreuzer, started from Oberwald, and made the first ascent of the north summit via the long Geren valley and the Geren glacier. Only Elmer and Kreuzer traversed to the somewhat higher southern summit.

See also
List of mountains of Ticino
List of mountains of Valais
List of most isolated mountains of Switzerland

References

External links
Pizzo Rotondo on Summitpost
Pizzo Rotondo on Hikr

Mountains of the Alps
Alpine three-thousanders
Mountains of Switzerland
Mountains of Valais
Mountains of Ticino
Ticino–Valais border
Lepontine Alps